The 1894-95 season was the 1st in the history of the Kent League. Chatham were champions.

Division 1

League table

Source: RSSSF,
Non-League Football Matters

Division 2

League table

Source: The History of Dover Football Club

References

1894–95 in English association football leagues